Kurt Liebrecht (24 December 1936 – 21 April 2022) was a German former footballer who played as a midfielder for BSG Lokomotive Stendal and East Germany football team.

Club career 
Born in Saxony-Anhalt, he played for his hometown team BSG Lokomotive Stendal. He amassed 197 East German top-flight appearances.

Liebrecht earned 16 caps for East Germany. He made his debut for them on 30 October 1960 in a 5–1 friendly win at the Ostseestadion in Rostock. His only international goal came on 21 November 1962 in a 2–1 win over Czechoslovakia at the Walter Ulbricht Stadion, in the preliminary round of qualification for the 1964 European Nations' Cup.

Career statistics

Club
Source:

International

International goals
Scores and results list East Germany's goal tally first.

References

External links
 
 
 

1936 births
2022 deaths
People from Stendal
Footballers from Saxony-Anhalt
German footballers
Association football midfielders
East Germany international footballers
German footballers needing infoboxes
East German footballers